Hong Kong League Cup 2008–09 is the 9th Hong Kong League Cup.

All teams of Hong Kong First Division League 2008–09 will play in this competition.

Calendar

Bracket

All times are local (UTC+8).

First round

Quarter-finals

Semi-finals

 Kitchee used more than the allowed maximum of 6 foreign players after the 89th minute. Since it did not affect the final qualification of Convoy Sun Hei, the decision which awarding a 3–0 win to Convoy Sun Hei, was made on 20 April 2009, the date after the final of this competition.

Final

Scorers
The scorers in the 2008–09 Hong Kong League Cup are as follows:

6 goals
 Giovane (Convoy Sun Hei)

4 goals
 Yuto Nakamura (TSW Pegasus)

3 goals
 Itaparica (TSW Pegasus)
 Alex (Eastern)

2 goals
 Lau Chi Keung (Convoy Sun Hei)

1 goal
 Caleb Ekwenugo (NT Realty Wofoo Tai Po)
 Paulinho (Citizen)
 Chao Pengfei (Happy Valley)
 Edson Minga (Fourway)
 Christian Annan (NT Realty Wofoo Tai Po)
 Au Yeung Yiu Chung (South China)

 Julius Akosah (Eastern)
 Leung Tsz Chun (Mutual)
 Zeng Qixiang (Eastern)
 Lee Hong Lim (TSW Pegasus)
 Lee Wai Lim (NT Realty Wofoo Tai Po)
 Wilfred Bamnjo (Convoy Sun Hei)
 So Loi Keung (NT Realty Wofoo Tai Po)
 Lam Hok Hei (Fourway)
 Cheng Siu Wai (TSW Pegasus)
 Wong Chun Yue (Eastern)
 Ye Jia (NT Realty Wofoo Tai Po)
 Carlos (Convoy Sun Hei)
 Lo Chi Kwan (Convoy Sun Hei)

Own goals
 Xiao Xiao (Sheffield United)
 Machado (Eastern)
 Carlos (Convoy Sun Hei)

References and notes

External links
League Cup - Hong Kong Football Association

2009 domestic association football cups
Lea
2008-09